Tracy Municipal Airport may refer to:

 Tracy Municipal Airport (California) in Tracy, California, United States (FAA: TCY)
 Tracy Municipal Airport (Minnesota) in Tracy, Minnesota, United States (FAA: TKC)